Stein Mill is a historic grist mill located in Greenwich Township, Berks County, Pennsylvania.  The mill was built in 1857, and is a 3 1/2-story banked stone building measuring 37 feet, 4 inches, wide by 45 feet, 9 inches, deep.  Also on the property is the miller's house; a stone dwelling with the oldest section dated to about 1816.  It operated as a merchant mill until 1899.

It was listed on the National Register of Historic Places in 1990.

Gallery

References

Grinding mills in Berks County, Pennsylvania
Grinding mills on the National Register of Historic Places in Pennsylvania
Houses completed in 1816
Industrial buildings completed in 1857
Houses in Berks County, Pennsylvania
1816 establishments in Pennsylvania
National Register of Historic Places in Berks County, Pennsylvania